Francis Reid (16 June 1920 – 2 February 1970) was a Scottish professional footballer who played as a striker for Cumnock Juniors, Huddersfield Town, Stockport County and Mossley.

References

1920 births
1970 deaths
Footballers from East Ayrshire
Scottish footballers
Association football forwards
English Football League players
Huddersfield Town A.F.C. players
Stockport County F.C. players
Cumnock Juniors F.C. players
Mossley A.F.C. players